José Valencia Amores (born 18 February 1961) is an Ecuadorian diplomat and lawyer, who served as Minister of Foreign Affairs of Ecuador between 2019 and 2020, designated by president Lenín Moreno. Currently, he serves as representative of Ecuador to the World Trade Organization.

He studied law at the Catholic University of Ecuador.

References

Foreign ministers of Ecuador
Living people
1961 births